The 2010 Brown Bears football team was an American football team that represented Brown University during the 2010 NCAA Division I FCS football season. Brown tied for second in the Ivy League. 

In their 14th season under head coach Phil Estes, the Bears compiled a 6–4 record and outscored opponents 247 to 210. Brown averaged 7,970 fans per game. Patrick Conroy, Kyle Newhall-Caballero and Andrew Serrano were the team captains. 

The Bears' 5–2 conference record tied them with Harvard and Yale for second place in the Ivy League. Brown outscored Ivy opponents 177 to 136. 

Brown played its home games at Brown Stadium in Providence, Rhode Island.

Schedule

References

Brown
Brown Bears football seasons
Brown Bears football